Alec Ingwersen (27 July 1941 – 21 September 2016) was an Australian rules footballer who played for the Melbourne Football Club in the Victorian Football League (VFL).

Notes

External links 

1941 births
2016 deaths
Australian rules footballers from Victoria (Australia)
Melbourne Football Club players